Celia Cruz and Friends: A Night of Salsa is a live album by Cuban salsa musician Celia Cruz. The album was recorded during a concert on May 12, 1999 in Hartford, Connecticut which was broadcast by PBS. Among the participants of the concert were Tito Puente, Johnny Pacheco, La India, and Isidro Infante. The album peaked at number twelve on the Billboard Tropical Albums chart. The album received a Latin Grammy Award for Best Salsa Album and a nomination for Tropical Album of the Year at the Lo Nuestro Awards of 2001.

Track listing

References 

1999 live albums
Celia Cruz live albums
Spanish-language live albums